Morton Marcus (1936–2009) was a poet and author having published more than 500 poems in literary journals across the country, including Poetry (Chicago), TriQuarterly, Ploughshares, Chelsea, The Chicago Review, The Iowa Review, Zyzzyva, Poetry Northwest, and The Denver Quarterly.  Four times his work was selected to appear in prize poem annuals (The Borestone Mountain Awards of 1967 and 1975, and the 1985 and 1987 Anthology of Magazine Verse).  His work has appeared in over 90 anthologies in the United States, Europe, and Australia.  He also has served as the poet in residence for several universities, and led workshops at colleges across America.  Marcus was also a long time co-host of The Poetry Show on KUSP (a former Santa Cruz public radio station). It was the longest running poetry radio show in the United States.

Marcus’s extensive poetry archive, working papers, and correspondence with a broad range of 20th century authors have been acquired by University of California Santa Cruz (UCSC) Special Collections, where they are available to both academic community and the public.  Additional information on the Morton Marcus Poetry Archive at UC Santa Cruz is available here:

The Morton Marcus Memorial Poetry Reading has become an established annual poetry reading series bringing some of the most accomplished poets in the country to Santa Cruz County. This annual event is held in November each year, is free to the public, and is sponsored by UC Santa Cruz, Cabrillo College, Poetry Santa Cruz, Ow Family Properties, Bookshop Santa Cruz, and the family of Morton Marcus.  Featured poets include: 2010 Robert Hass, 2011 Kay Ryan, 2012 Arthur Sze, 2013: Naomi Shihab Nye, 2014: Peter Everwine and Chuck Hanzlicek, 2015: Al Young, 2016: Joseph Stroud, 2017: Dorianne Laux, 2018: Gary Snyder, 2019: Gary Soto, 2020: Morgan Parker, 2021: Gary Young, and 2022: Natasha Trethewey.

Outside of the literary world, Marcus created a sixteen part television review of film Movie Milestones which has been shown on cable networks throughout the United States, along with being the main visual source of film history at AFTRS, the Australian national film school.  His film reviews became part of a television show Cinema Scene, shown in the San Francisco Bay Area, which he co-hosted with Richard von Busack.  In addition to writing and reviewing movies, Marcus also taught film and English at Cabrillo College in Santa Cruz.

Bibliography
Morton Marcus wrote eleven volumes of published poetry.
 Origins (6 editions 1969–1974)
 The Santa Cruz Mountain Poems (3 editions 1972–1992)
 Where the Oceans Cover Us (1972)
 Armies Encamped in the Fields Beyond the Unfinished Avenues (1977)
 Big Winds, Glass Mornings, Shadows Cast by Stars (2 editions 1981–1988)
 Pages from a Scrapbook of Immigrants (1988)
 When People Could Fly (1997) 
 Shouting Down the Silence: Verse Poems, 1988–2001 (pub. 2002)
 Moments Without Names: New & Selected Prose Poems (2002)
 Pursuing The Dream Bone (2007)
 The Dark Figure in the Doorway: Last Poems (2010).

In addition to poetry, Morton Marcus also authored The Brezhnev Memo (1980) a novel, and Striking Through The Masks: A Literary Memoir (2008).  Marcus also translated the works of Serbian poet Vasko Popa in The Star Wizard's Legacy (2010).

References

External links 
 
 "Morton Marcus Lives On"
 "Morton Marcus: Santa Cruz Poet"
 ForPoetry.com archives
 "phren-Z.org:  Morton Marcus Poetry Contest"

1936 births
20th-century American poets
American film critics
20th-century American memoirists
20th-century American novelists
American male novelists
2009 deaths
21st-century American poets
American male poets
20th-century American male writers
21st-century American male writers
21st-century American non-fiction writers
American male non-fiction writers